Lee Ying-yuan (16 March 1953 – 11 November 2021) was a Taiwanese politician. He was elected to the Legislative Yuan in 1995 and stepped down in 2000. In 2005, Lee was appointed the Minister of Council of Labor Affairs, which he led until 2007. Lee has also served as Secretary-General of the Executive Yuan and the Democratic Progressive Party, and was reelected to the Legislative Yuan in 2012. He was appointed the Minister of Environmental Protection Administration (EPA) in 2016. He left the EPA in 2018, and subsequently served as Taiwan's representative to Thailand from 2020 to 2021.

Early life, education and activism
Lee Ying-yuan was born into a family of farmers in 1953. He studied public health at National Taiwan University and earned a master's degree in health policy from Harvard University before receiving his PhD in health economics in 1988 from the University of North Carolina at Chapel Hill. Upon Lee's graduation, he was slated to teach at NTU, but was placed on a blacklist and barred from returning to Taiwan by the Kuomintang-led government, stemming from his pro-democracy activities in the Formosa Incident during Taiwan's martial law period. During Lee's time as a student in the United States, he was also an active member of the World United Formosans for Independence, which attracted more of the KMT's attention.

Return to Taiwan
He was released in May 1992, after would-be colleagues at National Taiwan University intervened on his behalf. Revisions to Article 100 were also passed that month, and meant that evidence of possible threats had to be submitted to the Commission of Violence prior to indictment or arrest.

Political career
Lee was elected to the Legislative Yuan in 1995. He then became the youngest convener of the Democratic Progressive Party (DPP) caucus in the legislature. Following DPP’s successful presidential election in 2000, Lee was appointed by President Chen Shui-bian to be the Deputy Representative of the Taipei Economic and Cultural Representative Office (TECRO) in the U.S. and then Secretary-General of the Executive Yuan. He was then named the DPP candidate for Taipei City's 2002 mayoral election, losing to incumbent mayor Ma Ying-jeou in a landslide.

He was named the head of the Council of Labor Affairs in 2005, and stayed on in the Su Tseng-chang cabinet. Under his leadership, the CLA sought to decrease the number of job-related deaths and injuries causing disabilities. In 2008, Lee was named the Secretary-General of the Democratic Progressive Party and deputy Yunlin County magistrate under Su Chih-fen. He resigned the deputy magistracy to run in a legislative-by election caused by the annulment of Chang Sho-wen's election. However, Lee lost a primary to Liu Chien-kuo. He was re-elected to the Legislative Yuan in 2012.

During the summer of 2015, Lee accompanied DPP chairperson and presidential nominee Tsai Ing-wen on her visit to the United States, along with DPP General Secretary Joseph Wu. Lee was named Tsai's Environmental Protection Administration minister after she won the 2016 election. He stated that his goal was to transform the EPA into a full-fledged ministry within 18 months of taking office. On 1 December 2018, Lee stepped down from the EPA. 

In June 2020, Lee was appointed representative of Taiwan to Thailand, succeeding , and formally took office on 13 August 2020. Lee's resignation from the position was approved on 4 August 2021, and took effect on 1 September 2021.

Personal life
Lee was married to Laura Huang (黃月桂).

Death
Lee died of pancreatic cancer on 11 November 2021, at the age of 68 in National Taiwan University Hospital.

References

External link

1953 births
2021 deaths
Taiwanese politicians of Hakka descent
Democratic Progressive Party Members of the Legislative Yuan
National Taiwan University alumni
Taiwan independence activists
Yunlin County Members of the Legislative Yuan
Harvard School of Public Health alumni
Members of the 8th Legislative Yuan
Members of the 9th Legislative Yuan
Members of the 3rd Legislative Yuan
University of North Carolina at Chapel Hill alumni
Party List Members of the Legislative Yuan
Members of the 4th Legislative Yuan
Magistrates of Yunlin County
Taiwanese Ministers of Environment
Taiwanese Ministers of Labor
Representatives of Taiwan to Thailand
Deaths from pancreatic cancer
Deaths from cancer in Taiwan